The 1948 BAA playoffs was the postseason tournament  following the Basketball Association of America 1947–48 season. Following its third, 1948–49 season, the BAA and National Basketball League merged to create the National Basketball Association or NBA. The tournament concluded with the Baltimore Bullets defeating the Philadelphia Warriors 4 games to 2 in the BAA Finals.

The two Division champions and two teams involved in a 3-way tiebreaker began tournament play on Tuesday, March 23, and the Finals concluded on Wednesday, April 21. Baltimore and Philadelphia played 12 and 13 games in the span of 30 days; their six final games in 12 days.

Bracket
There were no byes. Western and Eastern champions St. Louis and Philadelphia immediately played a long semifinal series with St. Louis having home-court advantage. Philadelphia won the seventh game in St. Louis, 85–46, two days before Baltimore concluded its sequence of tie-breaker (not shown) and two short series with other runners-up.

Division Tiebreakers

Western Division Tiebreakers

Washington Capitols @ Chicago Stags

Baltimore Bullets @ Chicago Stags

First round

(W2) Baltimore Bullets vs. (E2) New York Knicks 

This was the first playoff meeting between these two teams.

(E3) Boston Celtics vs. (W3) Chicago Stags 

This was the first playoff meeting between these two teams.

BAA Semifinals

(W1) St. Louis Bombers vs. (E1) Philadelphia Warriors 

 This was the first game 7 in league history and also the first road team to win game 7. It was also the Warriors' last game 7 win on the road until 2018.

This was the second playoff meeting between these two teams, with the Warriors winning the first meeting.

(W2) Baltimore Bullets vs. (W3) Chicago Stags 

This was the first playoff meeting between these two teams.

BAA Finals: (E1) Philadelphia Warriors vs. (W2) Baltimore Bullets

This was the first playoff meeting between these two teams.

External links
 1948 Playoff Results at NBA.com
 1948 BAA Playoffs at Basketball-Reference.com

Playoffs
Basketball Association of America playoffs

it:Basketball Association of America 1947-1948#Play-off
fi:BAA-kausi 1947–1948#Pudotuspelit